The Cremona Baptistery (Italian: Battistero di Cremona) is a religious edifice in Cremona, northern Italy. It is annexed to the city's Cathedral.

Built in 1167, it is characterized by an octagonal plan, a reference to the cult of St. Ambrose of Milan, symbolizing the Eight Day of Resurrection and, thenceforth, the Baptism.
The edifice mixes Romanesque and Lombard-Gothic styles, the latter evident in the preference for bare brickwork walls. To the 16th century restorations belong the marble cover of some walls, the pavement and the baptismal font (1531) and the narthex (1588) of the entrance, in Romanesque style, work by Angelo Nani.

The interior has a 14th-century Crucifix, over the St. John altar, and two wooden statues portraying "St. Philip Neri" and "St. John the Baptist" by Giovanni Bertesi. Over the ceiling is a 12th-century statue of the Archangel Gabriel.

See also
 History of medieval Arabic and Western European domes

Notes

Churches completed in 1167
12th-century Roman Catholic church buildings in Italy
Catholic baptisteries
Baptistery
Romanesque architecture in Lombardy
Gothic architecture in Lombardy
Baptisteries in Italy